Fred B. Hadley (July 2, 1911 – August 2, 1988) was a member of the Ohio House of Representatives, serving from 1967 to 1978. A longtime legislator, Hadley was often involved in legislation regarding education, technology advancement, and labor issues. His district consisted of the direct Northwestern Corner of Ohio.

References

1911 births
1988 deaths
Republican Party members of the Ohio House of Representatives
20th-century American politicians